Carla Dawn Qualtrough   (born October 15, 1971) is a Canadian politician and former Paralympic swimmer who is the minister of employment, workforce development and disability inclusion since 2019. Qualtrough has sat as the member of Parliament (MP) for Delta since she was first elected in 2015, as a member of the Liberal Party. She served as minister of public services and procurement and accessibility from 2017 to 2019, and minister of sport and persons with disabilities from 2015 to 2017.

Early life and education
Qualtrough was born in Calgary, Alberta, on October 15, 1971, to parents Patricia and Harry Qualtrough, and was raised in Langley, British Columbia. Qualtrough has been visually impaired since birth and only sees 10 percent with her glasses on. She graduated from Brookswood Secondary School and studied political science at the University of Ottawa before earning a law degree from the University of Victoria in 1997. Her parents separated when she was a teenager and her father died in 2007.

Paralympic career 
Qualtrough's visual impairment qualified her to compete in the Paralympic Games. She earned three bronze medals in swimming at the 1988 and 1992 Summer Paralympics, as well as four world championship medals for Team Canada. During the Paralympics, she swam in the 4x100 medley relay and 4x100 freestyle relay.

Legal career
After earning her law degree, Qualtrough served on the governing board of the Americas Paralympic Committee. She also served as president of the Canadian Paralympic Committee from 2006 to 2011. During this time, she also directed Sport Initiatives for 2010 Legacies Now and Chaired the Sport Dispute Resolution Centre of Canada, leading to her election as one of Canada's Most Influential Women in Sport of 2009.

As a lawyer, Qualtrough primarily focused on human rights matters. She served as counsel to the British Columbia Human Rights Tribunal and the Canadian Human Rights Commission, and prior to her election to the House of Commons, she was the vice-chair of British Columbia's Workers' Compensation Appeal Tribunal. In recognition of her work, she was a recipient of the Queen Elizabeth II Diamond Jubilee Medal in 2012. During the 2012 Summer Paralympics, she was the International Paralympic Committee's (IPC) legal officer and later received the IPCs International Women's Day Recognition in 2016. In 2021, Qualtrough became part of the Canadian Disability Hall of Fame.

Political career
On November 4, 2015, Qualtrough was named minister of sport and persons with disabilities in the 29th Canadian Ministry, headed by Justin Trudeau. As a result, she became the first Paralympic athlete to be elected to Canadian Parliament. During her tenure, Qualtrough was inducted into the Canadian Paralympic Committee's Canadian Paralympic Hall of Fame in 2017.

In a cabinet shuffle triggered by the resignation of Judy Foote, Qualtrough succeeded Foote as minister of public services and procurement on August 28, 2017; Kent Hehr then took over as minister of sport and persons with disabilities. After the cabinet shuffle on July 18, 2018, Qualtrough retained her ministerial position but gained the added portfolio of accessibility, styled as "minister of public services and procurement and accessibility".

The November 20, 2019, cabinet shuffle had Qualtrough become minister of employment, workforce development and disability inclusion, building on her work in the accessibility portfolio.

Personal life
Qualtrough is married to the former secretary-general of the International Wheelchair Rugby Federation, Eron Main, and they have four children together.

Electoral record

References

External links
 Official Website
 Mandate letter from Prime Minister
 

Living people
Members of the House of Commons of Canada from British Columbia
Liberal Party of Canada MPs
Women members of the House of Commons of Canada
Paralympic swimmers of Canada
Canadian Paralympic Committee presidents
Canadian politicians with disabilities
Canadian sportsperson-politicians
Swimmers at the 1988 Summer Paralympics
Swimmers at the 1992 Summer Paralympics
Blind politicians
Women in British Columbia politics
Sportspeople with a vision impairment
People from Delta, British Columbia
Politicians from Calgary
Swimmers from Calgary
University of Ottawa alumni
University of Victoria alumni
Members of the King's Privy Council for Canada
Members of the 29th Canadian Ministry
Ministers of Labour of Canada
1971 births
Women government ministers of Canada
Paralympic bronze medalists for Canada
University of Victoria Faculty of Law alumni
Canadian female freestyle swimmers
21st-century Canadian women politicians
Medalists at the 1988 Summer Paralympics
Medalists at the 1992 Summer Paralympics
Paralympic medalists in swimming
Canadian Disability Hall of Fame